Veneno Antimonotonia (In English: "Anti-Monotony Poison") is an album by Cássia Eller, released in 1997. The album is an homage to Brazilian singer and composer Cazuza, with re-recordings of some of his songs.

Track listing

"Brasil"
"Blues Da Piedade"
"Obrigado (Por Ter Se Mandado)"
"Menina Mimada"
"Todo Amor Que Houver Nessa Vida"
"Billy Negão"
"Bete Balanço"
"A Orelha De Eurídice"
"Só As Mães São Felizes"
"Ponto Fraco"
"Por Que A Gente É Assim?"
"Preciso Dizer Que Te Amo"
"Mal Nenhum"
"Pro Dia Nascer Feliz"

References

Cássia Eller albums
1997 albums